Zendstation Smilde, also known as the CJ2 Data tower (Dutch: CJ2 Datatoren) is a tall partially guyed tower in Hoogersmilde, the Netherlands, built in 1959, for directional radio services and TV and FM-transmissions. The structure is similar to the Gerbrandy Tower (IJsselstein), and consists of an 80-metre-high reinforced concrete tower and, until a fire on 15 July 2011, had a guyed tubular mast mounted on top. When first built, the tower, including the mast, was 270 metres high. The addition of a further section (analog TV - UHF antenna) to the mast increased its total height to 303.5 m (996 ft).
In September 2007 the analog TV - UHF antenna was removed and replaced by a new UHF antenna for DVB-T, reducing the tower's height to 294 m (965 ft). After rebuilding the collapsed tower in 2012, the new height is 303 metres.

Owner 
Originally the mast was built by the state company for Post and Telephony (Koninklijke KPN N.V.) but due to privatisation this has changed. Several masts in The Netherlands, including above mentioned Gerbrandy Tower, have a complex ownership structure:

 The 82 m high concrete tower is owned by Alticom BV
 The steel mast on top of the concrete tower is owned by NOVEC BV, a 100% daughter of TenneT BV, which is itself 100% state-owned
 The grounds on which the mast is located is owned by KPN, except for a ring of 3 m around the base of the tower which is owned by Alticom.

Aircraft incident 
On 14 August 1968 a US Air Force plane, an F-100 Super Sabre, from the Lakenheath Air Force Base in England was involved in an accident in heavy low clouds where the tip of a wing hit and broke one of the guy-wires of the tower, causing the upper section of the tower to bend. The pilot made an emergency landing at Soesterberg Royal Netherlands Air Force Base with considerable damage to the right wing.

Fire and collapse 

On 15 July 2011, the antenna section caught fire and collapsed, leaving only the concrete base standing.

In the above-mentioned report a warning was given that there was an increased risk of accidents in the masts, mainly because of the complex ownership structure and that because of that (safety) processes were unclear. An investigation by the Dutch police didn't show any (criminal) negligence or other factors that could have caused the fire.

Rebuilding the mast 
The above fire destroyed the steel mast on top of the concrete tower completely and the top of the concrete tower (the base of the steel mast) was damaged. The owner of the steel mast, NOVEC BV, announced that starting in March 2012, the new mast will be placed on top of the concrete tower and that the new mast will be operational in the summer of 2012. The new mast will be a few metres higher than the destroyed one bringing the mast to the same height as before 2006, and will be a steel lattice construction instead of the original tube style. This will prevent the 'chimney effect', and thus safer in case of a fire. On 14 May 2012, at 10:35 the highest point was reached by the builders of VolkerWessels The mast was fully operational again in October 2012.

See also 
 List of towers
 List of masts

References

External links 

Smilde Transmission Tower on fire and collapsing on 15 July 2011 (YouTube video)
Smilde Transmission Tower on fire and collapsing on 15 July 2011 (YouTube video)
Rebuiling the mast at Hoogersmilde, continuing story on FM TV DX website

Communication towers in the Netherlands
Towers in Drenthe
Midden-Drenthe
Towers completed in 1959
1959 establishments in the Netherlands
2011 disestablishments
2012 establishments in the Netherlands
21st-century architecture in the Netherlands
20th-century architecture in the Netherlands